In the 1971–72 season West Ham United played in the First Division of English football, finishing 14th.

Season summary
The highlight of West Ham's season came in reaching the semi-finals of the League Cup. After beating title challengers Leeds United and Liverpool, they faced Stoke City in the last four. West Ham won the first leg 2–1 away, but were beaten 1–0 at Upton Park, with Geoff Hurst having a late penalty saved by his England international team-mate Gordon Banks three minutes from the end. The teams then drew 0–0 after extra time in a replay at Hillsborough, and the tie was eventually decided when Stoke won a dramatic second replay 3–2 at Old Trafford, seven weeks after the sides had first met. The game was memorable for Bobby Moore having a stint in goal after West Ham's goalkeeper Bobby Ferguson went off injured, and saving a penalty from Stoke's Mike Bernard, only for Bernard to score from the rebound.

West Ham's form suffered after the League Cup defeat, and they won just four more League matches before the end of the season. In the FA Cup, they struggled past non-League Hereford United in a replay, but were then eliminated by relegation-threatened Huddersfield Town in the fifth round.

This season was the last as West Ham players for club stalwarts Hurst and Harry Redknapp.

League table

Results

Football League First Division

FA Cup

League Cup

Players

References

1971-72
English football clubs 1971–72 season
1971 sports events in London
1972 sports events in London